Bathytyphlops is a genus of deepsea tripod fishes known only from the eastern Atlantic Ocean.

Species
There are currently two recognized species in this genus:
 Bathytyphlops marionae Mead, 1958 (Marion's spiderfish)
 Bathytyphlops sewelli (Norman, 1939)

References

Ipnopidae
Taxa named by Orvar Nybelin